The 2003 NC State Wolfpack football team represented North Carolina State University during the 2003 NCAA Division I-A football season. The team's head coach was Chuck Amato.  N.C. State has been a member of the Atlantic Coast Conference (ACC) since the league's inception in 1953.  The Wolfpack played its home games in 2003 at Carter–Finley Stadium in Raleigh, North Carolina, which has been NC State football's home stadium since 1966.

Schedule

Roster

Rankings

Game summaries

Western Carolina

Wake Forest

Ohio State

Source: ESPN

Texas Tech

North Carolina

Georgia Tech

Connecticut

Clemson

Duke

Virginia

Florida State

Maryland

Tangerine Bowl

Awards and honors
Philip Rivers – ACC Offensive Player of the Year

Team players in the 2004 NFL Draft

References

NC State
NC State Wolfpack football seasons
Cheez-It Bowl champion seasons
NC State Wolfpack football